An Min-chol is a North Korean politician and bureaucrat.  He was a delegate to the 10th and 11th sessions of the Supreme People's Assembly.  In addition, he serves at the general manager of the Sŏwŏn Cooperative Farm Committee in Pŏng-gun, South Hwanghae Province.

See also
 Politics of North Korea
 List of Koreans

References
 Yonhap News Agency.  "Who's who in North Korea," pp. 787–812 in 

Living people
Members of the Supreme People's Assembly
People from South Hwanghae
Year of birth missing (living people)